John Jackson Mackay, Baron Mackay of Ardbrecknish  (15 November 1938 – 21 February 2001) was a Scottish Conservative and Unionist Party politician.

Early life
Mackay was born in 1938, the son of Jackson and Jean Mackay, and was educated at Campbeltown Grammar School, the University of Glasgow (BSc) and Jordanhill College of Education, where he graduated with a Diploma in Education. Mackay started his career as a mathematics teacher, becoming Head of Mathematics at Oban High School.

Political career
He was a Tory candidate for the Western Isles in the February 1974 election having, in the climate of the era, accepted he could realise his original Liberal Parliamentary ambitions only by joining the Conservatives. He contested Argyll in October 1974 and was Member of Parliament for the constituency from 1979 to 1983, and after boundary changes, for Argyll and Bute from 1983 to 1987, when he lost the seat to the Liberal candidate Ray Michie – the daughter of Lord Bannerman, a local Liberal.

Mackay was Parliamentary Under-Secretary of State for Scotland from 1982 to 1987 with responsibility for Health and Social Work and was Commons Scottish spokesman on Agriculture (which was the responsibility of the Earl of Mansfield sitting in the Lords). Against the advice of officials he supported a Private Member's Bill on solvent abuse, a scourge of the time, which became law in 1983. In Health he threw himself into the 1982 NHS strikes and a modernisation of mental health legislation.

House of Lords
Following his defeat, he was given a life peerage as Baron Mackay of Ardbrecknish, of Tayvallich in the District of Argyll and Bute. He rejoined the government as a Lord in Waiting in 1993. In January 1994, he joined the Department of Transport as a Parliamentary Under-Secretary of State, being promoted later that year to become Minister of State at the Department of Social Security, a post he held until 1997. During this time he was held in high regard by both the civil servants who worked with him and by the ex-Service community with whom he had regular contact in his role as War Pensions Minister. In addition, he was sworn of the Privy Council in the 1996 Birthday Honours and was appointed to be a deputy lieutenant of the city of Glasgow on 7 January 1997. In opposition, he served as deputy leader of the Conservative peers.

Death
He died in 2001 in Wandsworth at the age of 62.

References

Sources
Times Guide to the House of Commons 1983 (London: Times Books, 1984).
Times Guide to the House of Commons 1987 (London: Times Books, 1988).

Roth, Andrew "Obituary: Lord Mackay of Ardbrecknish", The Guardian. Retrieved 24 May 2013.

External links 
 

|-

|-

|-

|-

|-

1938 births
2001 deaths
Conservative Party (UK) Baronesses- and Lords-in-Waiting
Members of the Parliament of the United Kingdom for Scottish constituencies
UK MPs 1979–1983
UK MPs 1983–1987
Mackay of Ardbrecknish
People educated at Dunoon Grammar School
Scottish Conservative Party MPs
Life peers created by Elizabeth II
Members of the Privy Council of the United Kingdom